Spryfield is community within the urban area of Halifax, Nova Scotia, Canada.

History

The land now known as Spryfield was first occupied by the Miꞌkmaq people, who hunted and fished at Beaver Lake (now called Long Lake). The Miꞌkmaq would later help the first Europeans in settling upon their arrival by the mid-18th century.

The community gets its name from Captain Lieutenant-General William Spry, who purchased land in the area in 1769. Originally known as Spry's Field, the community is centred on Spry's former estate.

Founded around 1770, by Captain William Spry, who purchased land there and established the settlement with the aid of stationed soldiers from the nearby Halifax garrison. In 1783, he sold the property and returned to England. The name Spryfield is also sometimes used to refer to the general area of Halifax's South Mainland, which includes a number of communities along the Herring Cove and Purcell's Cove Roads.

The availability of land suitable for farming, and the relative close proximity to the Halifax market attracted the European settlers. These included the Brunt, Connors, Drysdale, Findlay, Henneberry, Kidston, McInnis, Moor, Norris, Oakley, Sutherland, Umlah, Warner, Yeadon, and  other-families--many of whom still reside in the community today.

Spryfield's first public school opened in 1859. Its teacher, Elizabeth Sutherland, taught the town's early residents. In 1958, Elizabeth Sutherland Memorial School opened in her honour.

Of particular note was Henry Lieblin, a Halifax baker who held  of land by the latter 18th-century. A large development, Lieblin Park, began in the early-1950s. It was named in his honour. Lieblin's farm was about where Elmsdale Crescent is today.

As the community developed--and more people moved to the community, Spryfield mainly consisted of homes-and-roads off three main-roads (Herring Cove Road, The Northwest Arm Drive, and Old Sambro Road). However, after World War II, developers began to build subdivisions to accommodate the many new residents of the still-rapidly-growing greater Halifax area. Leiblin Park-and-Thornhill Park were among the first, being built from 1955-to-1965. Later developments include a large-development in the Colpitt Lake barrens area, Cowie Hill, Elgin subdivision, Green Acres (which was left unfinished), Greystone (formerly Carson Street) subdivision, a modest cooperative development by the McIntosh Runs across from B.C. Silver Junior High School, and three-subdivisions off Williams Lake Road. Initially, these were single-family dwellings, but higher-densities began to be achieved by the late-1970s, when the Cowie Hill subdivision was built with mostly townhouses, and two large apartment-buildings. Greystone is mostly row houses, and there are now a number of apartment-building-complexes in the area. such as the one off River Road, facing J.L. Ilsley High School, and the 500 block near Green Acres.

Until 1968, Spryfield was a part of Halifax County. It voted to become a part of the City of Halifax in that year, via a general referendum. In 1969, the City of Halifax annexed Spryfield, as well as Armdale, Clayton Park, Fairview, and Rockingham.

On 1 April 1996, Halifax County was dissolved and all of its places (cities, suburbs, towns, and villages) were turned into communities of a single-tier municipality named Halifax Regional Municipality. Subsequently, Spryfield was turned into a community within the new Municipality of Halifax.

Spryfield has a history of large forest fires, which in more recent decades seems to have peaked in the 1960s, when a number of large fires burned a significant proportion of the forests in the area. The largest Spryfield fire of the 21st-century began on 30 April 2009, when a forest fire erupted in the afternoon in the Green Acres area, forcing as many as 1,000 people to flee their homes. As many as 12 houses were destroyed and an area of approximately  burned, between the Herring Cove and Purcell's Cove Roads: the fire travelled quickly between these major highways but did not cross either of them. The cause was not determined but dead wood from trees downed during Hurricane Juan fueled the blaze. Firefighters from Halifax Regional Fire and Emergency and the Nova Scotia Department of Natural Resources fought the fire.

Today, Spryfield is a bustling community within the built-up area of Halifax, with many activities, amenities, and services available to its residents.

Geography
According to the Halifax Regional Municipality Urban Forest Master Plan of 2013, the community of Spryfield has a landmass of 1,074 hectares (10.74 km2), and is bounded to the north by Armdale, to the south by Long Pond and to the east by the Purcell's Cove Road.

Parks and recreation
Spryfield has numerous lakes of various sizes for swimming and non-motorized boating in the summer months, which offers programs to children and youth year-round. The community is surrounded by forested areas, and in addition to the lakes there are numerous opportunities for berry-picking, exploring, and hiking.

Community Centres
Boys & Girls Clubs of Greater Halifax
Captain William Spry Community Centre

Community Gardens
Urban Farm Museum Society of Spryfield

Fields
Graves-Oakley Memorial Park

Libraries
Captain William Spry Community Centre

Masonic Lodges
Duke of Kent 121

Museums
Mainland South Heritage Society
Urban Farm Museum Society of Spryfield

Mutual Societies
Chebucto Connections
Pathways to Education

Parks
Graves-Oakley Memorial Park
Long Lake Provincial Park (Nova Scotia) 

Pools
Captain William Spry Community Centre

Trails
McIntosh Run Community Trail

Demographics
According to the article Spryfield Highlights by Dennis Pilkey (sourced from 2016 Census information), Spryfield had a population of 11,728 people, and a population density of approximately 1,091 people per km2. In 2016, the population density of Spryfield was over 14 times as dense as the municipal population density.

Although there is demographic from the 2016 Census, there is no demographic information from the most current 2021 Census.

Economy

From the time of colonization until the 1950s, Spryfield was predominantly rural with many farms. The earliest farms were the Kidston Farm (near Thornhill Park), and the Umlah Farm (south of Long Lake).

In the early part of the 20th-century, there was a granite quarrying operation in what is now the northern portion of Long Lake Provincial Park. Much of this granite can still be seen in historic buildings and walls in Downtown Halifax. 

Until the late 1950s, aggregate pits-and-gravel pits, such as the operation to the south of Elizabeth Sutherland Memorial School, helped provide material for building local roads until the late 1950s. Most of Spryfield has been logged at least once, and until the mid-1960s, a sawmill operated on the east-side of Kidston Lake.

Until approximately 1960, there was relatively (compared to overall population density) more business and industrial activity in the Spryfield area than subsequently. In the 1960s-and-1970s, many people began to travel to Downtown Halifax to the shopping centres-and-malls within the built-up area of Halifax to do their purchases. Eventually, the community took on a bedroom community aspect: many of the residents work elsewhere, with fewer thriving local businesses. The establishment of the Spryfield Mall in the mid-1970s was an attempt to reverse this trend, but it struggled to fill its floorspace. However, there is still a vigorous and growing business community in the Spryfield area, with a good amount of recent development.

Transportation
Spryfield is serviced by many roads that traverse the community. Furthermore, public transit is provided by Halifax Transit, and many routes serve the community.

Roadways
Highway 32 (Dunbrack Street), which connects to Highway 3 (St. Margaret's Bay Road), Highway 102 (Bicentennial Highway), and Route 306 (Old Sambro Road)
Route 306 (Old Sambro Road)
Route 349 (Herring Cove Road), off which all other roads in Spryfield branch either primarily or secondarily
William's Lake Road, which connects Route 253 (Purcell's Cove Road) to Route 349 (Herring Cove Road)

Halifax Transit Routes
Route 9B (Herring Cove)
Route 9A (Greystone/Fotherby)
Route 24 (Leiblin Park)
Route 25 (Governors Brook)
Route 127 (Cowie Hill Express)
Route 415 (Purcells Cove)

Education
To service the continuous development of apartment-complexes, detached-homes, and subdivisions, there are schools located in Spryfield for all ages. This includes day cares, elementary schools, a high school, and junior high schools. Children may attend English-or-French Immersion speaking classes starting in elementary school.

All public-schools within Spryfield are administered by the Halifax Regional Centre for Education.

Elementary Schools
Central Spryfield Elementary
Chebucto Height Elementary School
Elizabeth Sutherland School
John W. Macleod Fleming Tower Elementary (Fleming Tower)
John W. Macleod Fleming Tower Elementary (John W. MacLeod)
Rockingstone Heights School

High Schools
J. L. Ilsley High School

Junior High Schools
Cunard Junior High School
Elizabeth Sutherland School
Herring Cove Junior High
Rockingstone Heights School

Politics
Federal
Andy Fillmore is the Member of Parliament for Halifax, which in 2004 was re-organized to include the community of Spryfield.

Municipal
Patty Cuttell is the Municipal Councillor for District 11 (Spryfield-Sambro Loop-Prospect Road).

Provincial
Brendan Maguire is the Member of the Legislative Assembly for Halifax Atlantic, the constituency that includes the community of Spryfield.  He was elected in 2013.

Notable people
Jackie Barrett – Special Olympics Powerlifter, amassed fifteen powerlifting medals at four Special Olympics World Games appearances
John Buchanan (Canadian politician) - former Premier of Nova Scotia
Joey Comeau – writer, creator of A Softer World
Peter North – (born Alden Brown) pornographic performer and producer
Matt Robinson – poet 
Eliza Kidston Law, mother of former British prime minister Bonar Law, was born in Spryfield.

References

External links
 Captain William Spry Public Library
 HRM's Recreation Site
 Spryfield Community Association (originally the Spryfield Residents' Association)

Communities in Halifax, Nova Scotia